"Never Felt Like This Before" is a song by English recording artist Shaznay Lewis. It was written by Lewis and Nowels for her first solo album Open (2004). The song peaked at number 8 on the UK Singles Chart and reached the top twenty in New Zealand.

Music video
The music video for "Never Felt Like This Before" is set in a nightclub setting with Lewis performing and with episodes of her love affairs intermixed with the performance. In the video for "Never Felt Like This Before", Lewis felt uncomfortable performing intimate moments with the male in the video because she felt she would be cheating on her partner, Christian Storm. They originally planned to have Lewis's partner in the video, but he was unavailable at the time, so they had to find a look-alike.

Track listings

Notes
  denotes additional producer

Personnel and credits 
Credits adapted from the liner notes of Open.

 Rusy Anderson – electric guitar
 Paul Bushnell – bass
 Nikki Harris – background vocals
 Kevin Kerrigan – drums
 Greg Kurstin – keyboards

 Shaznay Lewis – lyrics and music, vocals
 Rick Nowels  – instruments, lyrics and music, producer
 Tim Pierce – electric guitar
 Wayne Rodrigues – drums, keyboards

Charts

References 

2004 singles
Songs written by Rick Nowels
Songs written by Shaznay Lewis
Song recordings produced by Rick Nowels
2004 songs
London Records singles